Carl O. Helvie (August 13, 1932 – December 3, 2019) was an American registered nurse and Professor Emeritus of Nursing at Old Dominion University. Helvie is known for his development and implementation of the Helvie Energy Theory of Nursing and Health.

As a lung cancer survivor he has focused on holistic alternative integrative health and wellness interventions. A major part of his career also focused on education, practice and research with homeless and low-income individuals and families. He has published books, articles, and research findings in these three areas.

Published works

Helvie, C, (1975) Self-Assessment of Current Knowledge in Community Health Nursing. New York: Medical Examiners Publishing Co.	
Helvie, C. (1981) Community Health Nursing: Theory and Process New York: Harper & Row Co.
Helvie, C. (1991) Community Health Nursing: Theory and Practice, New York: Springer Publishing Co.
Helvie, C. (1998) Advanced Practice Nursing in the Community, Thousand Oaks, California: Sage Publishing Co
Helvie, C and Kunstmann, W. (1999) Homelessness in the United States, Europe, and Russia, Connecticut: Greenwood. June
Clark, C (editor in chief), Gordon, R. (contributing editor), Harris, B. and  Helvie, C. (advisory contributing editors) (1999) Encyclopedia of Alternative Health Practices. New York, Springer Publishing Co	
Helvie, C. (2000) "The homeless, health promotion and nursing centers." Community Health Promotion (C.C.Clarke, editor) New York:Springer
Helvie, C. (2002) "Home care for the seriously ill in the United States." In Ambuant vor stationär. Perspektiven für eine integrierte ambulante Pflege Schwerstkranker  (Schaeffer, D. and Ewers, M., Editors).  Bern: Huber Verlag. Germany	
Helvie, C. (2002) "Community Mobilization and Participation." In Health Promotion in Communities (C.C. Clark, Editor). New York, Springer. Pg 69-82.
Helvie, C. (2002) "Health Promotion in a Homeless Center." In Health Promotion in Communities. (C.C. Clark, Editor). New York: Springer. Pg 461-464.
Helvie, C. (2007) Healthy Holistic Aging: A Blueprint for Success, Minnesota: Syren Publications.
Helvie, C (2012) You Can Beat Lung Cancer: Using Alternative/Integrative Interventions. with chapters by  Dr Bernie Siegel, Dr Francisco Contreras, Dr James Forsythe, Dr Kim Datzell, and Tanya Harter Pierce, London: Ayni Books.

References

1932 births
2019 deaths
Nursing theorists
Male nurses
Nursing researchers
American talk radio hosts
Public health researchers
American nurses
Old Dominion University faculty